Vinayaka Missions Sikkim University is located in  Gangtok  in Sikkim, India.

References

External links

2008 establishments in Sikkim
Universities and colleges in Sikkim
Educational institutions established in 2008
Private universities in India